The Endocrine Society is a professional, international medical organization in the field of endocrinology and metabolism, founded in 1916 as The Association for the Study of Internal Secretions. The official name of the organization was changed to the Endocrine Society on January 1, 1952. It is a leading organization in the field and publishes four leading journals. It has more than 18,000 members from over 120 countries in medicine, molecular and cellular biology, biochemistry, physiology, genetics, immunology, education, industry, and allied health. The Society's mission is: "to advance excellence in endocrinology and promote its essential and integrative role in scientific discovery, medical practice, and human health."

It is said to be "the world's oldest, largest and most active organization devoted to research on hormones and the clinical practice of endocrinology."

Annual Meetings have been held since 1916 except in 1943 and 1945 during World War II when meetings were cancelled at the request of the United States government. Realizing the increasing importance of endocrinology to general medicine, the Council, in 1947, established an annual post graduate assembly now known as the Clinical Endocrinology Update.

The Society publishes Endocrinology, the first issue of which was published in January 1927 and edited by Henry Harrower. Another publication, The Journal of Clinical Endocrinology, was established in 1941, and the name of the journal was changed to The Journal of Clinical Endocrinology and Metabolism on January 1, 1952.

Hormone Health Network
In 1997, The Society established The Hormone Foundation, a public education affiliate; the name was changed to the Hormone Health Network in 2012. The mission of the Network is to serve as a resource for the public by promoting the prevention, treatment and cure of hormone-related conditions through outreach and education.

Sister societies
The Endocrine Society provides a forum for other related societies to discuss, interact and share views in the field of endocrinology. The list of related societies is as follows:
 American Association of Clinical Endocrinologists (AACE)
 American Association of Endocrine Surgeons
 American Diabetes Association
 American Society for Bone & Mineral Research
 American Society for Reproductive Medicine
 American Society of Andrology
 American Society of Endocrine Physician Assistants
 American Thyroid Association
 Androgen Excess and PCOS Society
 Association for Program Directors in Endocrinology, Diabetes and Metabolism
 Endocrine Nurses Society
 International Society for Clinical Densitometry
 Pediatric Endocrine Society
 Pediatric Endocrinology Nursing Society
 Society for Behavioral Neuroendocrinology
 Society for Gynecologic Investigation
 Society for the Study of Reproduction
 The Association of Program Directors in Endocrinology, Diabetes and Metabolism
 The Obesity Society
 The Pituitary Society

Publications 
The Endocrine Society publishes the following journals:
 Discover Oncology
 Endocrine Reviews
 Endocrinology
 Journal of Clinical Endocrinology and Metabolism
 Molecular Endocrinology

References

External links
 
 The Hormone Health Network, the public education affiliate of The Endocrine Society

Medical and health organizations based in Washington, D.C.
Medical associations based in the United States
Endocrinology organizations
Organizations established in 1916
1916 establishments in the United States
1916 establishments in Washington, D.C.